Class 47 may refer to:

British Rail Class 47
CFR Class 47
New South Wales 47 class locomotive